The Sports Authority of Goa commonly abbreviated as SAG, is a body owned fully by the Government of Goa. It is responsible for the development of sports in the Indian state of Goa. It owns and maintains 14 sports complexes which include Olympic size swimming pools, FIFA approved football stadiums, jogging tracks and around 98 sports grounds all over the state.

History
The erstwhile state council of sports, renamed the Sports Authority of Goa has since its inception been rendering commendable service for the development of sports and games in Goa.

Lusofonia Games
The Goa Olympic Association won hosting rights for the 3rd edition of the prestigious Lusofonia Games from the ACOLOP to be held from 18–29 January 2014.
The Enormous task of development of sports infrastructure and organisation of this international sporting spectacle lies with the Sports Authority of Goa.

The sports infrastructure in the state is said to get a major boost by June 2013 for the hosting of the Lusofonia Games. Construction of new sports complexes of international standards has been proposed and the fatorda sports complex (which includes the Fatorda Stadium) is set to get a multi-crore revamp for these games.

Administration
The Sports Authority of Goa is currently headed by Shri.V.M.PrabhuDesai.

References

External links
 Official Website of SAG
 Official Website of DSYA
 Official Website of SAG

State agencies of Goa
Sport in Goa
Sports governing bodies in India
Government agencies with year of establishment missing